Louis D. Brandeis High School is public high school located in San Antonio, Texas (USA). It is part of the Northside Independent School District located in northwest Bexar County. All comprehensive high schools in the Northside Independent School District (NISD) are named for US Supreme Court Justices, in this case for Justice Louis D Brandeis. In 2017, the school was rated "Met Standard" by the Texas Education Agency, with a 2-Star Distinction for Academic Achievements in Mathematics and Top 25 Percent Student Progress.

Brandeis serves the Cross Mountain census-designated place.

Extracurricular activities
The school has Cross Country, Volleyball, Football, Basketball, JROTC, Swimming, Water Polo, Golf, Tennis, Track, Softball, Baseball, Soccer, Choir, Orchestra, Band and Bowling available as activities. National Honor Society (NHS), is a program also available to students who qualify based on grades, extra-curricular activities, service, and leadership.

The Broncos have a robotics team that competes in the FIRST Robotics Competition and FIRST Tech Challenge. The Bronc Botz robotics competition team includes four teams: FRC 3481, FTC 4602, FTC 4008, FTC 6976 and have been to the FIRST Championship in the past three years in St. Louis, Missouri.

Recently, the Brandeis Orchestra entered the TMEA Honors Orchestra competition, ranking 11th overall in the state. In 2012, Brandeis submitted a recording of two selections to the international Midwest Clinic in Chicago, and was one of four chamber ensembles selected to perform there in December 2013.
In 2018, the Brandeis Orchestra was invited and played at the prestigious Carnegie Hall.

Air Force Junior Reserve Officer Training Corps (AFJROTC)
Brandeis High School's AFJROTC Program (TX-20083) has won several national and regional awards. Recently the Blue Aces Unarmed Drill Team won the title of 2015 Nationals Champions. The current Senior Aerospace Science Instructor is Colonel Patrick Lopardi (USAF ret.) and additional Aerospace Science Instructors are MSgt. Ken Madden (USAF ret.) and MSgt. James Mangiafico (USAF ret.).

References

External links
Northside ISD

High schools in San Antonio
Public high schools in Bexar County, Texas
Northside Independent School District high schools
2008 establishments in Texas